Oly Town Artesians is an American soccer club from Olympia, Washington that plays in USL League Two, starting with 2022 season.

References 

USL League Two teams
2022 establishments in Washington (state)
Sports in Olympia, Washington
Association football clubs established in 2022
Soccer clubs in Washington (state)